The 2013 Beersheba shooting was a mass shooting that occurred in a Bank Hapoalim branch located in Beersheba, Israel, on May 20. Itamar Alon, an Israeli citizen, entered into the bank and opened fire, killing four and wounding five. He then took a woman hostage and killed himself when police arrived.

Background
The shooter, Itamar Alon, was a 39 year old Beersheba resident. He had done his mandatory military service in the Israel Defense Forces in the Combat Engineering Corps, and he rose to become an officer. He later transferred to the Israel Border Police, and participated in joint patrols with Palestinian police in the Tulkarm area. After completing his active service, he began working as a security guard for educational institutions and the Beersheba municipality, and served as a platoon commander in a reserve battalion. In 2002, he was caught in a shooting attack by two Palestinian militants in which two Israeli soldiers were killed, and killed one of the militants with his pistol. He was awarded a medal by Beersheba mayor Yaakov Turner. That same year, he was fired by the municipality at the end of his trial period of employment due to poor relations with co-workers. He was also transferred from his position as a reserve platoon commander to command a rearguard battalion in the IDF Home Front Command due to aggressive behavior and poor judgement.

In 2011, the Israel Police requested that Alon be stripped of his private gun license after he had been involved in a dispute with his neighbors and suspicions over him committing violence against his parents had emerged. After a court hearing, Alon was allowed to keep his gun license.

In May 2013, Alon's credit card was cancelled after he had accumulated a debt of about NIS 6,000, and the card was swallowed by an ATM when he tried to use it. On May 23, 2013, he visited the Bank Hapoalim branch in the Neve Ze'ev neighborhood of Beersheba requesting a debt settlement, and was refused. A few hours later, he returned to commit the shooting.

The shooting
At around 1:00 p.m., Alon returned to the Bank Hapoalim branch armed with a .45-caliber Glock 21 semiautomatic pistol and sat down together with other people waiting for services. He then got up and opened fire. The branch's manager, Avner Cohen and his deputy Meir Zeitun were killed, as were two customers, Idan Sabri and Anat Even-Haim. According to eyewitness accounts, Alon shot the two bank employees who were shot multiple times to ensure that they were dead. Five other people were wounded. Alon then took a woman, Miri Cohen, an employee of the bank, as a hostage, and barricaded himself with her in a bathroom. Within three minutes of the start of the shooting, the police arrived, with one policeman shooting a flowerpot as a deterrent as officers entered, and began searching for the shooter. One of the wounded victims was temporarily handcuffed after being mistaken for the shooter by police. After it became known that the shooter was in a bathroom together with a hostage, a police officer fired a single shot into the bathroom. The police negotiated with Alon until he shot himself. He was taken to Soroka Medical Center, where he died. Police officials stated that there was no security guard at the bank at the time of the incident.

Reactions
Israeli Prime Minister Benjamin Netanyahu called the shooting "a terrible tragedy". He said he does not remember such an event and that it is a phenomenon that is not common in Israel. During meeting with officials, Avigdor Lieberman said that the event is a terrorist attack by all means and that "there is no doubt it affects everything, and makes it clear what the right priorities are"

References

External links
Israel: five dead after gunfight in bank

Mass murder in 2013
Murder–suicides in Asia
Mass shootings in Israel
Murder in Israel
2013 Beersheba shootings
May 2013 events in Asia
2013 mass shootings in Asia
2013 murders in Israel